Gasoline Days is the fifth studio album released by Pub Rock band Eddie and the Hot Rods. It is produced and mixed by the Hot Rods themselves and Simon Milton. In 1992 the 'classic' line-up (Masters, Nichol, Higgs, and Gray) re-grouped for a European tour. Higgs left after the tour, but the band carried on with Steve Walwyn of Dr. Feelgood replacing him. Another Feelgood member, Gordon Russell, was also briefly a member, however, was soon replaced by Mick Rodgers, a former member of Manfred Mann's Earth Band. In 1994 they recorded the album Gasoline Days, released in 1996 by the Japanese label Creative Man. The band has been active intermittently since as the album didn't enjoy much success coupled with relatively poor reviews with one claiming "From teenage depression to mid-life crisis".

Track listing
All songs written by Paul Gray except where noted.
"Human Touch" (Paul Gray, Barrie Masters) - 2:46
"Emergency" - 4:06
"Just Do It" - 4:18
"Love Runaway" - 4:01
"Love Lies Bleeding" - 3:50
"It's Killing Me" - 4:31
"(Oh No) What You Gonna Do" - 3:11
"Crazy" - 4:38
"Gasoline Days" - 2:58
"Love Love Love" - 2:44
"Alive" - 4:21

Personnel
Eddie and the Hot Rods
Barrie Masters - vocals
Paul Gray - bass, backing vocals
Steve Nicol - drums, backing vocals
Mick Rogers - guitar, backing vocals

References 

1996 albums
Eddie and the Hot Rods albums